"Poland" is a song by American rapper Lil Yachty. It was released on October 11, 2022, through Quality Control Music.

Background and release
Lil Yachty had been working on a "non-rap album" intended to be a "psychedelic alternative project", which he announced in January 2022. The song was originally recorded in 2021.

In October 2022, a snippet of "Poland" leaked to the Internet. Shortly after, the song was met with positive reception from listeners and other artists. Wiz Khalifa, DDG, and Denzel Curry were all cited as referencing the song in a positive manner. Drake, Steve Lacy, and Offset were also cited as posting videos of themselves listening to or singing along to the song. The song achieved virality, being popularly used on TikTok and spawning various Internet memes.

The song was officially released to all music streaming platforms on October 11, marking his first official solo track of 2022. @kurtoart, a Twitter user, drew art depicting Lil Yachty's fictional journey to Poland, accompanied by Wockhardt cough syrup (the "wock" referenced in the song's chorus). While the song's cover art was originally a map of Poland, shaded in a "cough-syrup purple," Yachty announced he would change the cover art to @kurtoart's drawing.

Composition and lyrics
Produced by Lukrative, Lucian, and F1lthy of Working on Dying, the song features a synthy beat with a "cyber-vibrato" effect on Yachty's voice. A dissonant trap song, The Washington Posts Chris Richards wrote that "Yachty makes his voice — a melodized yawn that has chafed low-imagination rap purists from the start — do something new, elongating the most flexible syllables and allowing them to tremble with Auto-Tuned vibrato."

"Poland" has been noted by media outlets for its brevity and simple lyricism. In the song, Lil Yachty discusses "fiending" and battling his demons, and references the Nickelodeon comedy television series Kenan & Kel and its lead actors Kenan Thompson and Kel Mitchell. When going viral online, the lyric "I took the wock to Poland" was particularly singled out by listeners and garnered considerable media coverage. The term "wock" references Wockhardt, a pharmaceutical company known for producing types of cough syrup found in a cup of lean. Lil Yachty sings the lyric in "a manner somewhere between an operatic recitative and singing through a fan".

Prior to the release of "Poland", Yachty previously mentioned "wock" on his song "Wocky My Lover". The rapper has never performed in the country of Poland, however the rapper revealed the mention of Poland in the song originally came about as trolling from the day when he had some wock and noticed someone else was drinking a Poland Spring water bottle.

Critical reception
The song was praised by music journalists for its simplicity, with many outlets calling the song a "catchy", "hypnotic", or "mystifying" earworm. Its chorus featuring the "I took the wock to Poland" lyric was particularly lauded. Serge Selenou of Pitchfork opined that these factors are implemented in the rapper's best songs and wrote: "Over a churning F1lthy beat that wouldn't be out of place on Whole Lotta Red, Yachty croons "I took the Wock to Poland" in a garbled yodel that probably has Mason Ramsey jealous"; Selenou added that the song helped recapture the "light-heartedness that won Yachty fans."

Eric Skelton of Complex wrote that the hook on Poland is "so unique that we can't stop thinking about it," adding that Yachty's performance on the song is akin to "singing through a fan as he belts out "I took the wock to Poland" with extra warble in his voice." Skelton called the song "bizarre", and added that "Poland" is "weird as hell, strangely addictive, and ridiculously fun to sing along with."

Richards praised the Auto-Tune vibrato effect applied to Yachty's voice, writing that "in this funny, freaky, emotionally extravagant, tragicomic gush, he sounds like a machine that’s learned how to cry." Richards also positively received the song's concise nature, opining that "Yachty's brevity is casually artful, highly playful and totally real. "Poland" isn't short, it's fleeting, and you might even find the meaning of life in the difference between the two."

Recognition
On October 12, 2022, Quality Control Music CEO Pierre Thomas shared an alleged text conversation with Poland's Prime Minister Mateusz Morawiecki. The conversation shows Morawiecki inviting Lil Yachty to Poland.

Music video
An accompanying music video was produced by Lyrical Lemonade and released onto YouTube on October 11, 2022. Directed by Cole Bennett, the music video has received over 10.2 million views as of October 20.

Charts

Notes

References 

2022 songs
Internet memes introduced in 2022
Lil Yachty songs
Songs about drugs
Songs about Poland
Songs written by Lil Yachty
Psychedelic songs
Cloud rap songs